Zhiji may refer to any of the following:

 IM Motors, a Chinese electric car manufacturer
 Liu Zhiji, a Chinese historian and politician of the Tang dynasty
 Yuwen Zhiji, a military officer of the Sui dynasty

See also
 Jiutou Zhiji Jing, a yaojing and a character from the famed classic Chinese novel Investiture of the Gods